The Seagull's Laughter is a 2001 Icelandic film directed by Ágúst Guðmundsson. It stars Ugla Egilsdóttir as Agga, an orphaned preteen distrusting of her cousin Freyja, played by Margrét Vilhjálmsdóttir, who turns heads on her return from America, no longer the chubby teen that the Icelandic townspeople remember.

Set around 1950, the story portrays a pivotal moment in Iceland’s recent history: newly independent, with the legacy of the Second World War still prominent, Iceland is modernising and internationalising. The film is set in Hafnarfjörður, now effectively a suburb of Reykjavík, then a fishing town outside it. It is a close adaptation of the novel Mávahlátur by Kristín Marja Baldursdóttir, published in 1995 by Mál og menning.

It was Iceland's submission to the 74th Academy Awards for the Academy Award for Best Foreign Language Film, but was not accepted as a nominee.

Plot
The story is set around the 1950s, not very long after Iceland's independence from Denmark. The arrival of modernity in Iceland, including democracy, feminism, and new technologies and fashions, is an implicit theme throughout the text.

The narrative is presented from the perspective of Agga (played by Ugla Egilsdóttir), who during the three or so years covered by the story goes from being a preteen girl to being a young woman. The main agent in the story, however, is Agga's older step-cousin Freyja (played by Margrét Vilhjálmsdóttir). Freyja returns to Iceland from America after her American army officer husband died of a heart attack two months before. Freyja, who is dressed in American clothing, brought back 7 luggages of clothes with her from America, and amazes her Icelandic family - Agga's grandmother and her aunts Ninna and Dódó - with her clothes, perfumes, and her having a fridge in America. Agga becomes suspicious, suspecting that Freyja is an evil woman or indeed a witch, and should be sent back to America. However, no one believes her.

Regardless of her suspicion, Agga told Dísa (played by Bára Lyngdal Magnúsdóttir) about Freyja's return. Dísa was excited about the news, so she ran to where Freyja is staying to meet her. The family of girls then tried on Freyja's clothes from America, and held a mini fashion show inside their house.

Agga then decided to report her suspicion to the local policeman Magnús (played by Hilmir Snær Guðnason), telling him that Freyja is heartless and evil, and that she is a liar. Magnús did not take Agga seriously, laughed her accusations off, and sent her out of the police station. With no one on her side, Agga began to follow Freyja, hoping to find out more about her. Freyja was found frequently visiting the rocks near the sea, disappearing behind the rocks and only reappearing many hours later. As Agga found the rocks intimidating, she dared not follow Freyja behind the rocks, and therefore no one knows what Freyja does behind the rocks.

Agga realizes that Magnús doesn't take her seriously because she is dressed as a child, after some difficulties with the other women in the house she obtains a trench coat; dressed like an adult she returns to the station where Magnús finally hears her out.

Cast
 Margrét Vilhjálmsdóttir as Freyja
 Ugla Egilsdóttir as Agga
 Heino Ferch as Björn Theodór
 Hilmir Snær Guðnason as Magnús
 Kristbjörg Kjeld as Amma
 Edda Björg Eyjólfsdóttir as Dódó
 Bára Lyngdal Magnúsdóttir as Dísa
 Eyvindur Erlendsson as Afi
 Guðlaug Elísabet Ólafsdóttir as Ninna
 Sigurveig Jónsdóttir as Kidda
 Diijá Mist Einarsdóttir as Emelía
 Halldóra Geirharðsdóttir as Birna
 Jónína Ólafsdóttir as Læknisfrúin
 Charlotte Bøving as Mette
 Benedikt Erlingsson as Hilli
 Arnar Jónsson as Syslumaður
 Anna Kristín Arngrímsdóttir as Syslumannsfrú
 Gunnar Hansson as Unnusti Dódóar
 Baldur Trausti Hreinsson as Gummi
 Guðmundur Ólafsson as Dr. Enok
 Theódór Júlíusson as Þórður Lögga
 Sigurður Skúlason as Jói Betu
 Gunnar Helgason as Gauji Sígrenjandi
 Halldór Magnússon as Tobbi Spritt
 Kjartan Ragnarsson as Prestur
 Jón Júlíusson as Póstur
 Valgeir Guðjónsson as Hijómsveitarstjóri
 Magnús Ragnarsson as Rödd Björns Theodórs
 Lísa Pálsdóttir as Konur Í Heimsókn

See also
Cinema of Iceland
List of submissions to the 74th Academy Awards for Best Foreign Language Film

References

External links

2001 films
2001 romantic comedy films
2000s Danish-language films
Films directed by Ágúst Guðmundsson
Icelandic romantic comedy films